Otto Ludwig Lange (21 August 1927 – 14 August 2017 in Würzburg) was a German botanist and lichenologist. The focus of his scientific work was on the ecophysiology of wild and cultivated plants as well as lichens. He investigated heat, frost and drought resistance of lichens, bryophytes and vascular plants growing under extreme environmental conditions.

Life and education

Otto Lange was born in Dortmund on 21 August 1927. His family moved to Göttingen, where he went to school. Lange was drafted into the German army at age 16, and became a prisoner of war. This experience affected him greatly as a young man, and later in life he supported anti-war activism. After his return home, he studied biology, chemistry and physics at the Universities of Freiburg and Göttingen. It was from this latter institution that he earned his doctorate degree in 1952, defending a thesis titled "Heat and drought tolerance of lichens in relation to their geographic distribution". His supervisor was Franz Firbas. He also took the state examination for teaching at secondary schools. In 1959 he earned his habilitation in botany. From 1963 to 1967 he held the chair for Forest Botany and Technical Mycology at the University of Göttingen and was responsible for the Forestry Botanical Garden and Arboretum there. From 1967 Lange was Professor of Botany at the University of Würzburg, and also Chair of Plant Ecology, which included the management of the botanical garden.

Lange retired in 1992. He was married to the biologist Rose (née Wilhelm), and they had two daughters. Lange died on 14 August 2017 in Würzburg.

Career

Teaching
Lange taught general botany, forest botany, forest genetics, plant systematics, general ecology, ecophysiology, vegetation and plant sociology at the universities of Göttingen, Darmstadt and Würzburg. He carried out identification exercises for higher plants, mosses, fungi and lichens, and supervised experimental internships and excursions. He has taught as a visiting scholar at Utah State University, in Australia at Australian National University, and in China at Lanzhou University. Lichenologists Thomas Nash and Allan Green have spent considerable time in his laboratory as guest researchers.

Research
During Lange's 25 years at the University of Wurzburg he alternated long periods in the field with work analysing results back at the lab and writing scientific papers.
The aim of his ecological-botanical research was to quantitatively record the behavior and reactions of wild and cultivated plants, as well as of lichens in their outdoor locations in the interplay with their environment. Possibility of existence, distribution and productivity as a result of their morphological properties and their physiological functions were analyzed and causally interpreted. The water balance and photosynthetic carbon gain were a focus of interest. A constant change between measurements and experiments in the field and working under controlled conditions in the laboratory, for example in climatic chambers, was characteristic of such ecophysiological investigations. His research focused on plants and lichens in extreme growth areas  from the Antarctic to the tropical rainforest in Panama. His investigations were both basic research and applied aspectd, such as irrigation cultures in desert areas (e.g. in the Negev desert in Israel), work on forest damage caused by air pollutants, or the analysis of "biological soil crusts" as protection against erosion in arid areas. As exact ecophysiological metabolic measurements on plants under field conditions require a specially designed measurement method, Lange set up  mobile field laboratories  to continuously record photosynthesis and transpiration in plants. In cooperation with specialist companies (in particular, Heinz Walz GmbH), Lange developed special instruments, for  example,   air-conditioned cuvettes,  and "porometers" to determine gas exchange and diffusion resistance of plants and lichens.

Publications

Memberships 
1976–1981: "Board of Trustees of the Academy for Nature Conservation and Landscape Management", Munich / Laufen
1981–1988: Founder and spokesman of the Würzburg DFG research group "Ecophysiology"
1982–1989: Founding member and advisory board member of the “Bavarian Forest Toxicology Research Group” of the Bavarian State Ministry for Education and Culture
1987–1990: Chairman of the "Arid Ecosystems Research Center" of the Hebrew University Jerusalem (Israel)
1989–1991: Speaker of the DFG Collaborative Research Center 251 at the University of Würzburg "Ecology, Physiology and Biochemistry of Plant Performance under Stress"

Recognition

Honours and awards

1967: The United States Board on Geographical Names named a -high mountain in the Admiralty Range, South Victoria Land, Antarctica, as "Lange Peak" in recognition of the research on lichen ecology at the American Hallet Station, South Victoria Land
1972: Member of the German National Academy of Sciences Leopoldina
1974: Antarctic Service Medal from the United States Government
1978: Member of the Göttingen Academy of Sciences and Humanities
1978: Member of the Bavarian Academy of Sciences and Humanities
1984: Federal Cross of Merit 1st Class of the Order of Merit of the Federal Republic of Germany
1988: Balzan Prize for "applied botany including ecology" together with Michael Evenari, Hebrew University Jerusalem,
1988: Honorary member of the Regensburg Botanical Society
1989: Member of the Academia Europaea, London
1990: Adalbert Seifriz Prize for Technology Transfer (Stuttgart), together with master electrician Heinz Walz, Effeltrich
1991: Academia Scientiarum et Artium Europaea, Salzburg, Austria
1991: Bavarian Maximilian Order for Science and Art
1991: Honorary member of the British Lichen Society
1992: Honorary member of the Gesellschaft für Mykologie und Lichenologie 
1992: Acharius Medal of the International Association for Lichenology [6]
1993: Honorary member of the Society for Ecology
1994: Foreign honorary member of the American Academy of Arts and Sciences 
1995: Honorary doctorate from the Faculty of Biology, Chemistry and Earth Sciences at the University of Bayreuth
1996: Honorary Doctorate from the Technical University of Lisbon
2001: Honorary Doctorate from the Technical University of Darmstadt
2002: Honorary member of the German Botanical Society
2007: Eminent Ecologist Award from the Ecological Society of America
2012: Fellow of the Ecological Society of America
2014: Medal "Bene Merenti in Gold", in recognition of services to the University of Würzburg
2015: Cothenius Medal of the Leopoldina, for his outstanding botanical life's work

Ecological Studies Volume 100 was dedicated to Otto Lange’s retirement, while special volumes in lichenological journals also celebrated his 70th and 80th birthdays.

Eponymy
The lichen species Peltula langei , Hubbsia langei  and Jackelixia ottolangei , as well as the genus Langeottia  were named after Otto Ludwig Lange.

Selected publications
Lange has published about 400 scientific articles, roughly half of which dealt with lichens. About 170 of these were published after his retirement in 1992. A complete list of his scientific works can be found in Büdel's publication that celebrates his 80th birthday. Some of his major works include the following:

References

1927 births
2017 deaths
20th-century German botanists
German ecologists
German lichenologists
Acharius Medal recipients
Scientists from Dortmund
German prisoners of war in World War II
University of Göttingen alumni
Academic staff of the University of Göttingen
Academic staff of the University of Würzburg
Officers Crosses of the Order of Merit of the Federal Republic of Germany